The FinnProstate Group (FP), or FinnProstate Study Group, is a group of scientific researchers in Finland who have conducted a series of clinical trials of treatments for prostate cancer. The first publication by the group was in 1985 and the latest publication was in 2019.

Clinical trials
The studies conducted by the FinnProstate group include the following:

 FinnProstate-1 (FinnProstate-I; Finnish Multicentre Study of Prostatic Cancer) – ethinylestradiol 150 μg/day (1 mg/day initially) plus polyestradiol phosphate 80 mg/month (160 mg/month initially) versus orchiectomy for advanced prostate cancer
 FinnProstate-2 (FinnProstate-II) – polyestradiol phosphate 160 mg/month (with or without low-dose aspirin) versus orchiectomy for advanced prostate cancer
 FinnProstate-3 (FinnProstate-III) – cancelled
 FinnProstate-4 (FinnProstate-IV) – polyestradiol phosphate 160 mg/month versus buserelin (with cyproterone acetate 300 mg/day initially to prevent gonadotropin flare) in advanced or metastatic prostate cancer
 FinnProstate-5 (FinnProstate-V) – cancelled
 FinnProstate-6 (FinnProstate-VI) – polyestradiol phosphate 240 month (320 mg/month initially) versus orchiectomy for advanced prostate cancer
 FinnProstate-7 (FinnProstate-VII) – intermittent versus continuous androgen deprivation therapy for advanced prostate cancer
 Other studies by the FinnProstate group

Related trials
A related study, by the Finnish Zoladex Multicentre Study Group, assessed polyestradiol phosphate versus goserelin for advanced prostate cancer. A British group also assessed polyestradiol phosphate 160 mg/month versus orchiectomy for advanced prostate cancer. The SPCG-5 trial assessed polyestradiol phosphate 240 mg/month versus combined androgen blockade (triptorelin or orchiectomy plus flutamide) for advanced prostate cancer.

See also
 Scandinavian Prostate Cancer Group
 Prostate Adenocarcinoma: TransCutaneous Hormones

References

Clinical trial organizations
Evidence-based medicine
Prostate cancer
Scientific organizations